In organic chemistry, the Mannich reaction is a three-component organic reaction that involves the amino alkylation of an acidic proton next to a carbonyl functional group by formaldehyde and a primary or secondary amine or ammonia. The final product is a β-amino-carbonyl compound also known as a Mannich base. Reactions between aldimines and α-methylene carbonyls are also considered Mannich reactions because these imines form between amines and aldehydes. 
The reaction is named after Carl Mannich.

The Mannich reaction starts with the nucleophilic addition of an amine to a carbonyl group followed by dehydration to the Schiff base. The Schiff base is an electrophile which reacts in a second step in an electrophilic addition with an enol formed from a carbonyl compound containing an acidic alpha-proton. The Mannich reaction is a condensation reaction.

In the Mannich reaction, primary or secondary amines or ammonia react with formaldehyde to form a Schiff base. Tertiary amines lack an N–H proton and so do not react. The Schiff base can react with α-CH-acidic compounds (nucleophiles) that include carbonyl compounds, nitriles, acetylenes, aliphatic nitro compounds, α-alkyl-pyridines or imines. It is also possible to use activated phenyl groups and electron-rich heterocycles such as furan, pyrrole, and thiophene. Indole is a particularly active substrate; the reaction provides gramine derivatives.

The Mannich reaction can be considered to involve a mixed-aldol reaction, dehydration of the alcohol, and conjugate addition of an amine (Michael reaction) all happening in "one-pot". Double Mannich reactions can also occur.

Reaction mechanism
The mechanism of the Mannich reaction starts with the formation of an iminium ion from the amine and formaldehyde. 

The compound with the carbonyl functional group (in this case a ketone) will tautomerize to the enol form, after which it attacks the iminium ion.

On methyl ketones, the enolization and the Mannich addition can occur twice, followed by an β-elimination to yield β-amino enone derivatives.

Asymmetric Mannich reactions
Mannich reactions can employ (S)-proline chiral catalyst.

The reaction take place between propionaldehyde and an imine derived from ethyl glyoxylate. By modification of the proline catalyst to it is also possible to obtain anti-Mannich adducts.

Applications
The Mannich reaction is used in many areas of organic chemistry, Examples include:
 alkyl amines
 peptides, nucleotides, antibiotics, and alkaloids (e.g. tropinone)
 agrochemicals, such as plant growth regulators 
 polymers
 catalysts
 Formaldehyde tissue crosslinking
 Pharmaceutical drugs (e.g. rolitetracycline (the Mannich product of tetracycline and pyrrolidine), fluoxetine (antidepressant), tramadol and tolmetin (anti-inflammatory drug).
 soap and detergents. These compounds are used in a variety of cleaning applications, automotive fuel treatments, and epoxy coatings
 polyetheramines from substituted branched chain alkyl ethers
 α,β-unsaturated ketones by the thermal degradation of Mannich reaction products (e.g. methyl vinyl ketone from 1-diethylamino-butan-3-one)

See also
Betti reaction
Kabachnik–Fields reaction
Pictet–Spengler reaction
Stork enamine alkylation
Nitro-Mannich reaction

References

External links 
 

Carbon-carbon bond forming reactions
Multiple component reactions
Name reactions